Edward McMurray "Ed" Smith (October 31, 1870 – October 26, 1953) was an American politician and newspaper editor who served as the 16th secretary of state of Iowa from 1929 to 1931.

Early life and education 
Born in Jackson County, Iowa, Smith moved with his parents to Madison County, Iowa. He went to the Madison public schools. Smith then attended Dexter Normal School and Drake University.

Career 
From 1898 to 1900, Smith served as superintendent of Madison County Schools. In 1899, Smith became publisher and editor of The Winterset Madisonian in Winterset, Iowa. Smith served as postmaster for Winterset from 1904 to 1908. From 1917 to 1925, Smith served in the Iowa State Senate and was a Republican. In 1928, Smith was appointed Iowa secretary of state when the incumbent Walter C. Ramsay died in office. He served until 1931. In 1930, he unsuccessful sought the Republican nomination for governor of Iowa.

Death 
Smith died in a hospital in Winterset, Iowa after a brief illness.

Notes

1870 births
1953 deaths
People from Jackson County, Iowa
People from Winterset, Iowa
Drake University alumni
Editors of Iowa newspapers
Secretaries of State of Iowa
Republican Party Iowa state senators
19th-century American newspaper publishers (people)
Iowa postmasters
School superintendents in Iowa
19th-century American newspaper editors